Harrison W. Call (January 5, 1898 - August 29, 1975) served in the California State Assembly for the 29th and 27th district from 1937 to 1947. He served in the United States Army in the Mexican Expedition (1916–1917) and World War I.

References

United States Army personnel of World War I
Republican Party members of the California State Assembly
1898 births
1975 deaths
People from Farmington, New Mexico